Sigvard Munk (April 17, 1891 – April 10, 1983), was a Danish politician for the Social Democratic Party. From 1956 to 1962, he was the Lord Mayor of Copenhagen.

In 1943, while mayor of the social area, he took the initiative of evacuating the Torah scrolls of the Synagogue of Copenhagen.

He died a week prior to his 92nd birthday.

External links
 Book review: Erik Henriques Bing: Evakueringen af Københavns Synagoges toraruller i 1943

1891 births
1983 deaths
Mayors of places in Denmark
Social Democrats (Denmark) politicians